This is a list of airports in the U.S. state of Pennsylvania, grouped by type and sorted by location. The list includes public-use and military airports in the state. Some private-use and former airports may be included where notable, such as airports that were previously public-use, those with commercial enplanements recorded by the FAA, or airports assigned an IATA airport code.

Airports

</onlyinclude>

See also
 Essential Air Service
 Pennsylvania World War II Army Airfields
 Susquehanna Area Regional Airport Authority (SARAA), governing authority of four airports in south-central Pennsylvania.
 Wikipedia:WikiProject Aviation/Airline destination lists: North America#Pennsylvania

References

External links
Federal Aviation Administration (FAA):
 FAA Airport Data (Form 5010) from National Flight Data Center (NFDC), also available from AirportIQ 5010
 National Plan of Integrated Airport Systems (2017–2021), released September 2016
 Passenger Boarding (Enplanement) Data for CY 2016 (final), released October 2017

Pennsylvania Department of Transportation (PennDOT):
 Bureau of Aviation

Other sites used as a reference when compiling and updating this list:
 Aviation Safety Network – used to check IATA airport codes
 Great Circle Mapper: Airports in Pennsylvania – used to check IATA and ICAO airport codes
 Abandoned & Little-Known Airfields: Pennsylvania – used for information on former airports

 
Airports
Pennsylvania
Airports